Thomas Cooper (20 March 1805 – 15 July 1892) was an English poet and a leading Chartist. His prison rhyme the Purgatory of Suicides (1845) runs to 944 stanzas. He also wrote novels and in later life religious texts. He was self-educated and worked as a shoemaker, then a preacher, a schoolmaster and a journalist, before taking up Chartism in 1840. He was seen as a passionate, determined and fiery man.

Early years
Cooper was born in Leicester, the son of a working dyer. After his father's death, his mother began business as a dyer and fancy box-maker at Gainsborough, Lincolnshire, and young Cooper was apprenticed to a shoemaker. In spite of hardships and difficulties, he managed to educate himself, and at the age of 23, having been a shoemaker in Gainsborough, managed to open a school there in 1827. He had moved to Lincoln by 1834 and married Susannah Chaloner, a cousin of George Boole in that year. His wife died in 1880. He joined the Lincoln Mechanics' Institute in 1834 and shortly afterwards was on the Committee of Institute. He probably remained on it until he left Lincoln in 1838.

Chartist leader and lecturer
After journal work in Lincoln and London, where he for a couple of months edited "The Kentish Mercury" from Greenwich, Cooper joined the staff of the Leicestershire Mercury in 1840 and moved to Leicester. Leicester under his leadership became a Chartist stronghold, with its own journals, such as the Commonwealthman, and a school for adults. He became a leader and lecturer among them and in 1842 was imprisoned in Stafford for two years after riots in the Staffordshire Potteries, where he wrote his Purgatory of Suicides, a political epic. However, Cooper abandoned full-time radicalism on his release.

In his efforts to publish his work after his liberation Cooper came to the notice of Benjamin Disraeli and Douglas Jerrold. With Jerrold's help, the work appeared in 1845, and Cooper then turned his attention to lecturing on historical and educational subjects.

Writing and lecturing
While working on various papers, Cooper in 1850 ran Cooper's Journal, but only a few issues appeared. At the same time he adopted sceptical views, which he continued to hold until 1855, when he reconverted to Christianity, joined the Baptists, and was a preacher among them. According to his autobiography, he publicly announced his recovered faith during a lecture at London's Hall of Science on 13 January 1856, and began to challenge sceptics to debate. Though still calling himself a Chartist, he sought to earn a living and a reputation as a writer. In addition to his poems, he wrote several novels, although those like Alderman Ralph (1853) failed on both counts.

Although he had abandoned his religious beliefs at the time of his imprisonment, Cooper's next 30 years were spent as a lecturer in defence of Christianity, attacking the evolutionary theories of Charles Darwin and Ernst Haeckel. He authored Evolution, The Stone Book, and The Mosaic Record of Creation (1878), which argued for creationism and rejected evolution.

Cooper was impulsive, but an honest, sincere man. His autobiography (1872) is seen as a minor Victorian classic. In his later years he settled into being an old-fashioned Radical. His friends in 1867 raised an annuity for him, and in the last year of his life he received a government pension. He died in Lincoln on 15 July 1892 and was buried there.

Works
Cooper's main works were:
Wise Saws and Modern Instances, London, 1845; written in Stafford jail 
Two Orations against Taking Away Human Life, 1846, on non-resistance
The Baron's Yule Feast, London, 1846
Land for the Labourers, London, 1848
Captain Cobler: or, The Lincolnshire Rebellion : an historical romance of the reign of Henry VIII, London, 1850
Bridge of History over the Gulf of Time, London, 1871
Life of Thomas Cooper, written by Himself, London, 1872
Plain Pulpit Talk, London, 1872
God, the Soul, and a Future State, London, 1873
Paradise of Martyrs, London, 1873
Old-fashioned Stories, London, 1874. New York, 1893
Evolution, The Stone Book, and The Mosaic Record of Creation, London, 1878
Atonement, second series of Plain Pulpit Talk, London, 1880
Thoughts at Four Score, London, 1885

Cooper's Poetical Works were published in London, 1877.

References

Attribution:

Sources
Stephen Roberts (2008), The Chartist Prisoners: the Radical Lives of Thomas Cooper (1805–1892) and Arthur O'Neill (1819–1896)
[www.thepeoplescharter.co.uk People's Charter.]

External links

1805 births
1892 deaths
British Christian creationists
English prisoners and detainees
Chartists
Writers from Leicester
English male poets
19th-century English poets
19th-century British writers
19th-century English Baptist ministers
19th-century English theologians
British sceptics